Andrew Klavan (born July 13, 1954) is an American writer of crime and suspense novels and a conservative commentator. Klavan has been nominated for the Edgar Award five times and has won twice.

Klavan has also worked in film and as an essayist and video satirist. He is also known for being a conservative commentator and hosts The Andrew Klavan Show podcast on the conservative site The Daily Wire, a media company associated with political commentator Ben Shapiro.

Biography

Early life
Klavan was born to a secular Jewish family in New York City and grew up in Great Neck, Long Island, one of four sons born to father Gene Klavan, a New York disc jockey, and mother Phyllis, a homemaker. He graduated from the University of California, Berkeley with a degree in English Literature. He worked as a radio and newspaper reporter and a radio news writer before becoming a full-time writer.

Marriage and children
In 1980, he married Ellen Flanagan, daughter of Thomas Flanagan and sister of Caitlin Flanagan. They have two children, Spencer Klavan and Faith Moore and live in Nashville, Tennessee. Spencer Klavan is an Oxford-trained classicist who is married to Joshua Herr, general counsel for the Daily Wire.

Reversal in political views 
After graduating from Berkeley, Klavan began his writing career as a liberal. He became a conservative during the Reagan administration.

Conversion to Christianity
Klavan converted to Christianity at the age of 49 and was baptized privately. Initially he attended the Episcopal Church, but has since left for the Anglican Church in North America.

Career 
Klavan began his crime-writing career using the pseudonym Keith Peterson. Under that name, he wrote the four John Wells mysteries, about a crime-solving newspaper reporter, and also The Scarred Man, his first novel of psychological suspense.

Under his own name, Klavan has written crime novels, and the Homelanders series for young adults. His novels have been translated around the world. He has won two Edgar Awards from the Mystery Writers of America, the Thumping Good Read Award from W.H. Smith, and been nominated for Anthony Awards and the International Thriller Writers award.

True Crime was filmed by Clint Eastwood in 1999. Don’t Say a Word was filmed starring Michael Douglas in 2001. Donald Cammell's 1987 White of the Eye was based on the novel Mrs. White, which Klavan co-wrote under the pseudonym Margaret Tracy with his brother, playwright Laurence Klavan. Andrew wrote the screenplay for the 1990 Michael Caine film Shock to the System, based on the novel by Simon Brett, and for the 2008 horror film One Missed Call, which starred Shannyn Sossamon and Ed Burns. He also wrote the screenplay for the movie-in-an-app Haunting Melissa and its sequel, Haunting Melissa 2: Dark Hearts. He scripted the 2018 film Gosnell: The Trial of America's Biggest Serial Killer, a crime film based on the true story of an abortion doctor convicted of murder.

Klavan has produced several satirical online video series including Klavan on the Culture for PJ Media, The Revolting Truth for TruthRevolt, and A Very Serious Commentary for Glenn Beck's Blaze Media. He currently does a weekly podcast for the Daily Wire called the Andrew Klavan Show.

The Great Good Thing: A Secular Jew Comes to Faith in Christ, Klavan's first non-fiction book, was published in 2016. It is a memoir of his spiritual journey from secular Judaism and agnosticism to Christianity.

When Christmas Comes, Klavan's 36th novel, was published in 2021 and features themes of Christmas, tradition, and murder. It is a thriller novel situated in an idyllic town.

Awards 
Klavan's book Mrs. White, which he wrote under the pen-name Margaret Tracy, won the 1984 Edgar Award for Best Paperback Original. In 1989, his novel Trapdoor was nominated in the Best Paperback Original category. In 1990, he won the Edgar Award in the Best Paperback Original category for The Rain, as well as a nomination at the 1990 Anthony Awards for Rough Justice in the paperback category. Klavan was nominated for an Edgar Award for Best Novel in 1992 for his first novel, Don't Say a Word. He received an Anthony Awards nomination at the 1996 ceremony for True Crime in the Best Novel category.

Books

 Face of the Earth (1977)
 Agnes Mallory (1985)
 Mrs. White (1987) (as Margaret Tracy, with Laurence Klavan)
 There Fell a Shadow (1988) (as Keith Peterson)
 The Rain (1988) (as Keith Peterson)
 Darling Clementine (1988)
 The Trap Door (1988) (as Keith Peterson)
 Son of Man (1988)
 The Scarred Man (1989) (as Keith Peterson)
 Rough Justice (1989) (as Keith Peterson)
 Don't Say a Word (1991)
 The Animal Hour (1992)
 Corruption (1993)
 True Crime (1995)
 Suicide (1995)
 The Uncanny (1998)
 Hunting Down Amanda (1999)
 Man and Wife (2001)
 Dynamite Road (2003)
 Shotgun Alley (2004)
 Damnation Street (2006)
 Empire of Lies (2008)
 The Identity Man (2010)
 Crazy Dangerous (2012) 
 If We Survive  (2012) 
 Nightmare City (2013) 
 A Killer in the Wind (2013) 
 Werewolf Cop (2016) 
 The Great Good Thing: A Secular Jew Comes to Faith in Christ (2016) [non-fiction]
 When Christmas Comes (2021) 
 The Truth and Beauty (2022)
 A Strange Habit Of Mind (2022)

The Homelanders series

 The Homelanders: The Last Thing I Remember (2009)
 The Homelanders: The Long Way Home (2010)
 The Homelanders: The Truth of the Matter (2010)
 The Homelanders: The Final Hour (2011)

The Mindwar trilogy 
 Mindwar (2014)
 Hostage Run (2016)
 Game Over (2016)

The Another Kingdom trilogy 
 Another Kingdom (2019)
 Nightmare Feast (2020)
 The Emperor's Sword (2021)

Audio plays 
 Another Kingdom: Season 1 (2017)
 Another Kingdom: Season 2 (2018)
 Another Kingdom: Season 3 (2019)

Filmography

References

External links

 
 
 

Living people
1954 births
20th-century American novelists
21st-century American novelists
American bloggers
American male screenwriters
Converts to Anglicanism from atheism or agnosticism
Edgar Award winners
Jewish American writers
Male critics of feminism
Writers from New York City
Haas School of Business alumni
American male novelists
The Daily Wire people
Novelists from New York (state)
Manhattan Institute for Policy Research
Screenwriters from New York (state)
American male bloggers
Conservatism in the United States
20th-century American male writers